Huig (Hugh) Aart Maaskant (August 17, 1907 – May 27, 1977) was a Dutch architect. He designed a number of notable buildings in Rotterdam, his home city, and in Amsterdam, notably the Groothandelsgebouw in Rotterdam in 1951 and the Amsterdam Hilton Hotel in 1958.

Selected projects
 Groothandelsgebouw Rotterdam 1951
 Tomadohuis Dordrecht 1962
 Euromast Rotterdam 1960
 Scheveningen Pier 1961
 Neudeflat, Utrecht 1961
 Hilton Amsterdam 1962
 Hilton Rotterdam 1964
 Student Centre De Bunker Eindhoven 1969
 Seat of government for the Province of  Noord-Brabant 's-Hertogenbosch 1971

Gallery

References

  "Hugh Aart Maaskant" (in Dutch)

1907 births
1977 deaths
Architects from Rotterdam
20th-century Dutch architects